Wilmon is a male given name. Notable people with the name include:

Wilmon W. Blackmar (1841–1905), United States military officer
Wilmon Brewer (1895–1998), American literary scholar, poet, and philanthropist
Wilmon Newell (1878–1943), American entomologist
Wilmon Henry Sheldon (1875–1981), American philosopher

See also
Wilmont (disambiguation)

English masculine given names